Centro Cultural e Deportivo Cerceda was a Spanish football club based in Cerceda, in the autonomous community of Galicia. Founded in 1968, it last played in Segunda División B – Group 1, holding home games at Estadio O Roxo, which has a capacity of 2,500.

History
Cerceda made their debut in Tercera División in 1994. After 23 consecutive years playing in this league and 12 failed attempts to promote to Segunda División B, the club would finally play in the third tier after achieving a place by paying €133,000.

On 30 June 2018, after being relegated to Tercera División, the club was dropped one more tier due to nonpayment. However, the club did not register for any competition in the 2018–19 season, effectively ceasing to exist.

Season to season

1 season in Segunda División B
23 seasons in Tercera División

Current squad

Honours
Tercera División: 1995–96, 2002–03, 2003–04, 2010–11

Notable former players
 Gorka Luariz
 Manel

References

External links
Official website 
Futbolme team profile 

Football clubs in Galicia (Spain)
Association football clubs established in 1968
1968 establishments in Spain